Battalia is a genus of moths belonging to the subfamily Tortricinae of the family Tortricidae. The genus was erected by Ahmet Ömer Koçak in 1981.

Species

Battalia acmemorpha (Diakonoff, 1952)
Battalia anassa (Diakonoff, 1952)
Battalia anisographa (Diakonoff, 1952)
Battalia anthracograpta (Diakonoff, 1952)
Battalia apheles (Diakonoff, 1952)
Battalia colobodesma (Diakonoff, 1952)
Battalia cricophora (Diakonoff, 1952)
Battalia euphyes (Diakonoff, 1952)
Battalia fusca (Diakonoff, 1953)
Battalia insignis (Diakonoff, 1953)
Battalia lagaroptycha (Diakonoff, 1952)
Battalia lutescens (Diakonoff, 1952)
Battalia mimela (Diakonoff, 1952)
Battalia ochra (Diakonoff, 1952)
Battalia oligosta (Diakonoff, 1952)
Battalia pityrochroa (Diakonoff, 1952)
Battalia psara (Diakonoff, 1952)
Battalia rhopalodes (Diakonoff, 1952)
Battalia stenoptera (Diakonoff, 1952)
Battalia trulligera (Diakonoff, 1952)
Battalia verecunda (Diakonoff, 1952)

See also
List of Tortricidae genera

References

 , 1981, Priamus 1: 119.
 , 2005, World Catalogue of Insects 5.

External links
 tortricidae.com

Battalia (moth)
Tortricidae genera